Wang Shih-chien (born 1 January 1960) is a Taiwanese politician. A member of the Democratic Progressive Party, Wang served on the Taipei City Council from 1998 to 2005. He sat on the Legislative Yuan between 2005 and 2008. Wang was reelected to the Taipei City Council in 2010.

Early life and education
Wang was born in Taipei, Taiwan, on January 1, 1960. His maternal grandfather Zhang Rongzong was a leader in the Taiwan Cultural Association during the Japanese occupation period in Taiwan. He was executed in the February 28 incident by the Kuomintang. His father Wang Mingte was a member of the Communist Party in National Taiwan University.

Wang primarily studied at Chung Shan Primary School and secondary studied at Zaixing High School. After earning a Master of Chemistry degree from the Chinese Culture University, he became chairman of Richeng Construction Factory.

Political career
Wang served on the Taipei City Council from 1998 to 2005. He was elected to the Legislative Yuan in 2004, and served a single term until 2008. He contested the 2010 municipal elections, and returned to the Taipei City Council, representing the fourth constituency.

He is often mocked by opponents and Internet communities for his resemblance to Chucky, a possessed doll. However, he has embraced this nickname and has stated, “It is my job to protect the interests of Taipei residents, so I would be happy to be their Chucky to scare the mayor, city officials and others in authority so they do not abuse their power,”

Wang was given wide media exposure for losing a bet, in which he promised to jump into the sea if all eight of the Chinese Nationalist Party's candidates in Taipei City won during the 2008 Taiwanese Legislative Elections. He ended up keeping his promise, accompanying 280 supporters to the sea and jumping into it from a jet ski. "Here I am. I did what I promised," he said after completing the jump.

Personal life
Wang married Lin Hsiu-fen, the couple has a son and a daughter.

References

External links

1960 births
Living people
National Chung Hsing University alumni
Chinese Culture University alumni
Members of the 6th Legislative Yuan
Taipei Members of the Legislative Yuan
Democratic Progressive Party Members of the Legislative Yuan
Taipei City Councilors